Dejan Ognjanović (Cyrillic: Дејан Огњановић; born 21 June 1978) is a Montenegrin retired professional footballer who played as a defender. On the international level, he represented FR Yugoslavia most notably at the 2001 Kirin Cup as well as Montenegro from 2008 to 2010.

Club career

Partizan
Partizan made a move for Ognjanović shortly after his Kirin Cup debut for the Yugoslav national team in the summer transfer window of 2001. He immediately became a standard defender in Partizan's starting XI under coach Ljubiša Tumbaković. Partizan would win the First League of Yugoslavia in 2002 and 2003 with Ognjanović. Ognjanović's 2003–2004 season with Partizan was especially significant, as it was his first opportunity to be mentored by a foreign coach, Lothar Matthäus, who had been hired by Partizan before the end of the 2003 season. Matthäus would take Partizan to their first UEFA Champions League in many years in 2003-04 season, and Ognjanović would feature in the group stage that season, in the away loss (by a score of 1–0) against Real Madrid and the home game tie (1-1) against Olympique de Marseille.

Estoril
Ognjanović's first spell with Estoril began in the summer of 2004 when Partizan loaned him out to the Portuguese side on a one-year loan. In one of his first trainings with Estoril, Ognjanović suffered a catastrophic ankle injury which took him out of football until 2005. Amazingly, Estoril still pursued Ognjanović two years later, and would sign him permanently in 2006.

Łódź
Ognjanović then was transferred Polish side ŁKS Łódź in the 2008 summer transfer window, for a fee of approximately €16,000. He would play a full season with the Polish side, amassing 26 league appearances for the club.

Smederevo
After playing for ŁKS Łódź, Ognjanović came back to Serbian football after four years and signed with Smederevo in the winter 2009-10 transfer window. On 27 February 2010, Ognjanović made his debut with Smederevo and scored a goal in a 2–1 victory against FK Rad. After 18 months with Smederevo, he was loaned out to Albanian Superliga side Kastrioti Krujë where he spent one season, but would come back to FK Smederevo in the summer 2012 transfer window for which he played until December 2012.

Sutjeska
Ognjanović signed with Sutjeska Nikšić in January 2013, in a move that surprised the Montenegrin press due to the rivalry between Ognjanović's former club Budućnost and Sutjeska. Ognjanović won two Montenegrin national titles with Sutjeska, in 2013 and 2014.

International career
Ognjanović made two appearances with Yugoslavia's national team in the 2001 Kirin Cup, in a pair of losses to Japan and Paraguay. Seven years later, Ognjanović began to play for the newly independent Montenegro national football team, for which he made a total of five appearances up to 2010. His final international was a March 2010 friendly match against Macedonia.

Honours
Partizan
First League of FR Yugoslavia: 2001–02, 2002–03
Sutjeska
Montenegrin First League: 2012–13, 2013–14

References

External links
 
 

1978 births
Living people
People from Kotor
Association football defenders
Serbia and Montenegro footballers
Serbia and Montenegro international footballers
Montenegrin footballers
Montenegro international footballers
Dual internationalists (football)
FK Bokelj players
FK Budućnost Podgorica players
FK Partizan players
G.D. Estoril Praia players
FK Obilić players
ŁKS Łódź players
FK Smederevo players
KS Kastrioti players
FK Sutjeska Nikšić players
First League of Serbia and Montenegro players
Primeira Liga players
Liga Portugal 2 players
Ekstraklasa players
I liga players
Serbian SuperLiga players
Kategoria Superiore players
Montenegrin First League players
Serbia and Montenegro expatriate footballers
Expatriate footballers in Portugal
Montenegrin expatriate footballers
Montenegrin expatriate sportspeople in Portugal
Expatriate footballers in Poland
Montenegrin expatriate sportspeople in Poland
Expatriate footballers in Serbia
Montenegrin expatriate sportspeople in Serbia
Expatriate footballers in Albania
Montenegrin expatriate sportspeople in Albania